Primula nutans, also known as the sleepy primrose, is a species of flowering plant belonging to the family Primulaceae.

Description
Primula nutans is a perennial plant species. Plants possess green, sub-orbicular leaf blades. Leaves are around 2.5cm long with narrow petioles. Flowers are hosted on stalks, which stand tall above the leaves. Blooms can range from 2 - 8 flowers per plant. Petals are pale pink, however the colour shifts from white and then yellow towards the centre of the flower. Flowers range in diameter from 12 - 16mm.

Distribution
Primula nutans native range is spread from the subarctic to the Himalayas.

It can be found in the following countries: China, Finland, Norway, Nepal, Sweden, Mongolia, Russia, Kazakhstan and Pakistan.

It can also be found in the Canadian territory of Yukon and US state of Alaska. It was originally native to British Columbia, but it is now extinct.

Habitat
Can be found growing in open habitats such as wet meadows, marshes and in coastal habitats. It can also be found growing in areas where glacial movement has created moraine habitats or rocky outwash plains.

References

nutans